The  Asian Baseball Championship was the 23rd installment of the tournament. Japan won the competition for the second consecutive time.

Top four

References

2005
2005
Asian Baseball Championship
2005 in Japanese sport